Hudson Santos de Souza (born February 25, 1977) is a Brazilian middle-distance runner who competes mostly over 1500 metres. He has broken a number of South American records in middle-distance events.

He has won twice at the South American Cross Country Championships, with gold medals in the short race in 2002 and 2006. He also won the junior bronze medal in 1996.

Competition record

Personal bests
800 metres - 1:45.69 (2000)
1500 metres - 3:33.25 (2005) - South American record
One mile - 3:51.05 (2005) - South American record
2000 metres - 5:03.34 (2002) - South American record
3000 metres - 7:39.70 (2002) - South American record
5000 metres - 13:42.56 (2006)
3000 metres steeplechase - 8:30.70 (2006)

References

External links

1977 births
Living people
Brazilian male middle-distance runners
Athletes (track and field) at the 1999 Pan American Games
Athletes (track and field) at the 2000 Summer Olympics
Athletes (track and field) at the 2003 Pan American Games
Athletes (track and field) at the 2004 Summer Olympics
Athletes (track and field) at the 2007 Pan American Games
Athletes (track and field) at the 2008 Summer Olympics
Athletes (track and field) at the 2011 Pan American Games
Olympic athletes of Brazil
Pan American Games athletes for Brazil
Pan American Games gold medalists for Brazil
Pan American Games silver medalists for Brazil
Pan American Games bronze medalists for Brazil
Brazilian male steeplechase runners
Pan American Games medalists in athletics (track and field)
Medalists at the 1999 Pan American Games
Medalists at the 2003 Pan American Games
Medalists at the 2007 Pan American Games
Medalists at the 2011 Pan American Games
Sportspeople from Federal District (Brazil)
20th-century Brazilian people
21st-century Brazilian people